Calcager is a genus of flies in the family Tachinidae.

Species
Calcager apertum Hutton, 1901
Calcager dubius Malloch, 1938

References

Taxa named by Frederick Hutton (scientist)
Diptera of Australasia
Dexiinae
Tachinidae genera